The Great Moment is a 1921 American silent drama film directed by Sam Wood and starring Gloria Swanson, Alec B. Francis, and Milton Sills. The film is now considered lost though a fragment exists and is preserved at the BFI National Archive.

Plot

As described in a film magazine, Sir Edward Pelham (Francis), who has married a Russian Gypsy named Nada (Swanson), fears that his daughter Nadine (Swanson) will follow in her mother's footsteps and arranges a marriage with her cousin Eustace (Butler), whom she does not love. Her father takes her and Eustace on a trip to America to look over some mines in Nevada. During the journey she meets Bayard Delaval (Sills), a young engineer in her father's employ, and a warm friendship grows between them. While returning with Bayard to the hotel from the mine she is bitten on her breast by a rattlesnake. Bayard uses his pocketknife to open the wound and sucks out the poison. He takes her to his nearby shack and makes her drink some whiskey. Her father finds her with Bayard in his cabin and demands Bayard marry her at once. After the ceremony, Nadine is taken to the hotel and placed under the care of a physician. The father, disregarding all explanations, leaves for home. Recovering from the effects of the liquor, Nadine upbraids Bayard. Believing that Nadine does not love him, Bayard leaves her and prepares to sue for divorce. Sometime later in Washington, Bayard and Nadine meet again on the night of her engagement ball. Nadine has reconciled with her father and has agrees to marry Howard Hopper (Hull), a millionaire who is a cad and the talk of Washington society. Her father arrives and seeing Bayard and Nadine together and told that she loves him, does not stand in the way of their reunion.

Cast
 Gloria Swanson as Nada and Nadine Pelham
 Alec B. Francis as Sir Edward Pelham
 Milton Sills as Bayard Delaval
 F.R. Butler as Eustace 
 Raymond Brathwayt as Lord Crombie
 Helen Dunbar as Lady Crombie
 Julia Faye as Sadi Bronson
 Clarence Geldert as Bronson 
 Ann Grigg as Blenkensop
 Arthur Stuart Hull as Howard Hopper

References

External links

1921 films
1921 drama films
Silent American drama films
American silent feature films
American black-and-white films
Famous Players-Lasky films
Films directed by Sam Wood
Films shot in California
Paramount Pictures films
Lost American films
1921 lost films
Lost drama films
1920s American films